Alan James Shaw (17 November 1923 – 14 August 2016) was an Australian rules footballer who played with the Essendon Football Club in the Victorian Football League (VFL). Shaw also played for Brunswick in the Victorian Football Association (VFA).

Notes

External links 

Alan Shaw's playing statistics from The VFA Project
Essendon Football Club player profile

1923 births
2016 deaths
Australian rules footballers from Victoria (Australia)
Essendon Football Club players
Brunswick Football Club players